Leif Hansen (born 5 June 1934) is a Danish boxer. He competed in the men's light middleweight event at the 1960 Summer Olympics. At the 1960 Summer Olympics, he lost to Henryk Dampc of Poland.

References

External links
 

1934 births
Living people
Danish male boxers
Olympic boxers of Denmark
Boxers at the 1960 Summer Olympics
People from Hobro
Light-middleweight boxers
Sportspeople from the North Jutland Region